Vacation from Marriage (German: Eheferien) is a 1927 German silent comedy film directed by Victor Janson and starring Harry Halm, Lilian Harvey and Jutta Jol.

The film's art direction was by Jacek Rotmil.

Plot summary

Cast
 Harry Halm as Wenzel Strakosch, Violin-Virtuose  
 Lilian Harvey as Hella, seine zweite Frau  
 Jutta Jol as Erika, seine erste Frau  
 Hans Stürm as Carlos Torres, südamerikanisher Plantagenbesitzer  
 Bert Bloem as Enrique, sein Sohn 
 Angelo Ferrari as Rudi Becker, Tenor  
 Else Reval as Seine bessere Hälfte  
 Ida Perry as Frau Tuchel 
 Asta Gundt as Adalgisa, ihre Tochter 
 Harry Gondi as Hans, ein junger Mann 
 Ruth Beyer as Mizzi, Mädel von heute 
 Albert Paulig as Der Hoteldirektor

References

Bibliography
 Goble, Alan. The Complete Index to Literary Sources in Film. Walter de Gruyter, 1999.

External links
 

1927 films
Films of the Weimar Republic
Films directed by Victor Janson
German silent feature films
UFA GmbH films
German black-and-white films
1927 comedy films
German comedy films
Silent comedy films
1920s German films